The Kenyan National Assembly is the lower house of the Kenyan legislature. It consists of 350 members, comprising 290 members elected from single-member constituencies, 47 woman representatives elected from each county, 12 members nominated by the political parties, and the speaker of the assembly who is elected by the assembly and serves as an ex-officio member.

The members elected in the 2017 Kenyan general election and nominated afterwards served in the 12th Parliament of Kenya.

National Assembly Composition
The Jubilee Party was the largest party in the assembly with 173 seats (49%), including the Speaker. The National Super Alliance, a coalition of political parties, formed the largest opposition group. The Orange Democratic Movement was the largest opposition party

List of members

Members elected from constituencies

Woman representatives

Nominated members
The 2010 Kenyan constitution provides for 12 members to be nominated by the political parties to represent women, youth, people with disabilities, and workers. Parties can nominate members according to their proportional representation in the house.

Speaker and Deputy Speaker
The Speaker of the National Assembly is elected by the parliament and serves as an additional ex-officio member. The speaker from 2017 to 2022 was Justin Muturi. Moses Cheboi of the Jubilee Party was elected unopposed as deputy speaker.

Party leadership
Aden Duale was chosen by the Jubilee Party as the majority leader in 2017. He served in this office until he was replaced by Amos Kimunya in 2020. The majority whip was Emmanuel Wangwe.

John Mbadi of the Orange Democratic Movement was the minority leader. Junet Mohammed served as minority whip.

Notes

References

Politics of Kenya
Lists of members of the National Assembly of Kenya by term